Zacallites is a genus of extinct damselflies in the family Zacallitidae. The genus was created for the species Zacallites balli from the Eocene Green River Formation of Colorado. Another species Zacallites cockerelli was also described from the same area in 2020.

References

Calopterygoidea
Prehistoric odonates
Odonata genera
Prehistoric insect genera
Taxa named by Theodore Dru Alison Cockerell